Beckettville is a neighborhood in the City of Danbury, Fairfield County, Connecticut, United States. This section is located on the western side of Danbury, with Westville Avenue as its main thoroughfare. It is named after the Beckett family, former residents of the area.

References 

Neighborhoods in Connecticut
Populated places in Fairfield County, Connecticut
Geography of Danbury, Connecticut